Albert Rose (1 October 1875 – 31 May 1921) was an Australian rules footballer who played for the South Melbourne Football Club in the Victorian Football League (VFL). 

He also spent some time in South Africa, where he played two first-class cricket matches for Transvaal.

Notes

External links 

1875 births
1921 deaths
Australian rules footballers from Melbourne
Sydney Swans players
Australian cricketers
Cricketers from Melbourne
Gauteng cricketers
People from South Melbourne